Convivina intestini is a species of lactic acid bacteria.

References

Lactobacillaceae